The twelfth season of the Case Closed anime was directed by Yasuichiro Yamamoto (until episode 332) and Masato Satō (since episode 333) and produced by TMS Entertainment and Yomiuri Telecasting Corporation. The series is based on Gosho Aoyama's Case Closed manga series. In Japan, the series is titled  but was changed due to legal issues with the title Detective Conan. The episodes' plot follows Conan Edogawa's daily adventures.

The episodes uses five pieces of theme music: two opening themes and three ending themes.

The season initially ran from April 21, 2003, through February 23, 2004 on Nippon Television Network System in Japan. Episodes 316 to 353 were later collected into ten DVD compilations by Shogakukan. They were released between July 22, 2005, and November 25, 2005, in Japan.


Episode list

References
General

Specific

2003 Japanese television seasons
2004 Japanese television seasons
Season12